"Stamp on It" is a song recorded by South Korean supergroup Got the Beat for their first extended play of the same name. It was released as the EP's lead single by SM Entertainment on January 16, 2023.

Background and release
On December 23, 2022, SM Entertainment announced Got the Beat would be releasing a new song in January 2023. On December 29, it was announced they would be releasing their first extended play titled Stamp on It with lead single of the same name on January 16, 2023. On January 2, 2023, the promotional schedule was released. On January 15, the music video teaser was released.  The song was released alongside the extended play and its music video on January 16.

Composition
"Stamp on It" was written, composed, and arranged by Yoo Young-jin alongside Dem Jointz for the composition and arrangement, with Tayla Parx participating in the composition. It described as a R&B and hip-hop-based dance song characterized by "piano and bass rhythm" with lyrics about "expressing the story of reaching the top spot in a fierce stage competition". "Stamp on It" was composed in the key of F minor, with a tempo of 143 beats per minute.

Music video
The music video directed by Hong Jae-hwan, and Lee Hye-su of Swisher was released alongside the song by SM Entertainment on January 16. The "rough and powerful" music video portrays the members "flaunting their collections of luxury cars, jewellery, and fine art" with scenes that switches between their luxury lifestyle and them "performing dynamic choreography" created by Lachica featuring "a signature move portraying a stamping action".

Commercial performance
"Stamp on It" debuted at number 80 on South Korea's Circle Digital Chart in the chart issue dated January 15–21, 2023; on its component charts, the song debuted at number six on the Circle Download Chart, and number 106 on the Circle Streaming Chart. In Japan, the song debuted at number 69 on the Billboard Japan Top Download Songs in the chart issue dated January 25, 2023.

Promotion
Prior to the release of Stamp on It, the group performed the song at the SM Town Live 2023: SMCU Palace at Kwangya on January 1, 2023. They subsequently performed the song on January 19, on Mnet's M Countdown, and on the 32nd Seoul Music Awards.

Credits and personnel
Credits adapted from EP's liner notes.

Studio
 SM Booming System – recording, mixing, digital editing
 Sonic Korea – mastering

Personnel
 SM Entertainment – executive producer
 Lee Soo-man – producer
 Got the Beat – vocals, background vocals
 Yoo Young-jin – lyrics, composition, arrangement, vocal director, background vocals, recording, mixing, digital editing, music and sound supervisor
 Dem Jointz – composition, arrangement
 Tayla Parx – composition
 Jeon Hoon – mastering
 Shin Soo-min – mastering assistant

Charts

Weekly charts

Monthly charts

Release history

References

2023 singles
2023 songs
Korean-language songs
SM Entertainment singles
Songs written by Yoo Young-jin
Songs written by Dem Jointz
Songs written by Tayla Parx
South Korean hip hop songs